Caloptilia xanthochiria is a moth of the family Gracillariidae. It is known from South Africa and Réunion.

Hostplant: This species feeds on Searsia longipes (Anacardiaceae).

References

xanthochiria
Moths of Africa
Moths described in 1961